25D-NBOMe (or NBOMe-2C-D) is a derivative of the phenethylamine derived hallucinogen 2C-D. It acts in a similar manner to related compounds such as 25I-NBOMe, which is a potent agonist at the 5HT2A receptor. 25D-NBOMe has been sold as a street drug since 2010 and produces similar effects in humans to related compounds such as 25I-NBOMe and 25C-NBOMe. It was banned as a Temporary Class Drug in the UK on 10 June 2013 after concerns about its recreational use.

Legality

China
As of October 2015 25D-NBOMe is a controlled substance in China.

Sweden
Sveriges riksdag added 25D-NBOMe to schedule I ("substances, plant materials and fungi which normally do not have medical use") as narcotics in Sweden as of Aug 1, 2013,  published by Medical Products Agency in their regulation LVFS 2013:15 listed as 25D-NBOMe 2-(2,5-dimetoxi-4-metylfenyl)-N-(2-metoxibensyl)etanamin.

United Kingdom

United States
Unregulated at a federal and state level, though arguably may contravene the Federal Analog Act under certain circumstances given its structural and functional similarity to controlled substance 2C-D.

See also 
 25I-NBOMe (2C-I-NBOMe)
 25B-NBOMe (2C-B-NBOMe)
 25C-NBOMe (2C-C-NBOMe)
 25E-NBOMe (2C-E-NBOMe)
 25N-NBOMe (2C-N-NBOMe)
 25P-NBOMe (2C-P-NBOMe)
 25G-NBOMe (2C-G-NBOMe)
 25H-NBOMe (2C-H-NBOMe)
 25TFM-NBOMe (2C-TFM-NBOMe)

References 

25-NB (psychedelics)
Designer drugs